Uromys is a genus of rodents found in Melanesia and Australia. They are known as the giant naked-tailed rats. There are eleven species in the genus, with the most recent described in 2017.

Species
Giant naked-tailed rat, Uromys anak Thomas, 1907
Biak giant rat, Uromys boeadii Groves & Flannery, 1994
Giant white-tailed rat, Uromys caudimaculatus Krefft, 1867
Emma's giant rat, Uromys emmae Groves & Flannery, 1994
Masked white-tailed rat, Uromys hadrourus Winter, 1983
Emperor rat, Uromys imperator Thomas, 1888
Bismarck giant rat, Uromys neobritannicus Tate & Archbold, 1935
Guadalcanal rat, Uromys porculus Thomas, 1904
King rat, Uromys rex Thomas, 1888
Great Key Island giant rat, Uromys siebersi Thomas, 1923
Vangunu giant rat, Uromys vika Lavery & Judge, 2017

References

 
Rodent genera
Taxa named by Wilhelm Peters
Extant Pleistocene first appearances